Elections to Castlereagh Borough Council were held on 30 May 1973 on the same day as the other Northern Irish local government elections. The election used three district electoral areas to elect a total of 19 councillors.

Election results

Districts summary

|- class="unsortable" align="centre"
!rowspan=2 align="left"|Ward
! % 
!Cllrs
! % 
!Cllrs
! %
!Cllrs
!rowspan=2|TotalCllrs
|- class="unsortable" align="center"
!colspan=2 bgcolor="" | UUP
!colspan=2 bgcolor="" | Alliance
!colspan=2 bgcolor="white"| Others
|-
|align="left"|Area A
|bgcolor="#40BFF5"|55.4
|bgcolor="#40BFF5"|3
|25.8
|2
|18.8
|1
|6
|-
|align="left"|Area B
|bgcolor="#40BFF5"|41.2
|bgcolor="#40BFF5"|4
|20.8
|2
|38.0
|2
|8
|-
|align="left"|Area C
|bgcolor="#40BFF5"|59.6
|bgcolor="#40BFF5"|3
|19.9
|2
|20.5
|1
|5
|- class="unsortable" class="sortbottom" style="background:#C9C9C9"
|align="left"| Total
|50.6
|10
|22.1
|5
|27.3
|4
|19
|-
|}

Districts results

Area A

1973: 3 x UUP, 2 x Alliance, 1 x United Loyalist

Area B

1973: 4 x UUP, 2 x Alliance, 1 x United Loyalist, 1 x Loyalist Coalition

Area C

1973: 3 x UUP, 1 x Alliance, 1 x Independent

References

Castlereagh Borough Council elections
Castlereagh